The 2012–13 season was Wigan Athletic's eighth consecutive season in the Premier League. The club competed in the League Cup and reached both the semi-finals and the final of the FA Cup for the first time in their history. They beat Everton 3–0 at Goodison Park, with all three goals scored within a four-minute spell, to progress to the semi-final, and defeated Millwall at Wembley Stadium to reach the final. On 11 May, the club won the FA Cup for the first time after a 1–0 win against Manchester City in the final. The club then went on to set the unwanted record of becoming the first ever team to win the FA Cup and be relegated in the same season, going down after a 4–1 defeat to Arsenal on 14 May.

First-team squad

Transfers

In

Out

Squad statistics

Squad

|-
!colspan="12" style="background:#dcdcdc"| Goalkeepers

|-
!colspan="12" style="background:#dcdcdc"| Defenders

|-
!colspan="12" style="background:#dcdcdc"| Midfielders

|-
!colspan="12" style="background:#dcdcdc"| Attackers

|}

Top scorers
As of 19 May 2013

Disciplinary record

Includes all competitive matches.

Last updated 19 May 2013

Competitions

Pre season

Premier League

Premier League

Results by round

League table

FA Cup

League Cup

References 

Wigan Athletic F.C. seasons
Wigan Athletic F.C.